Below is a list of squads used in the 1998 Arab Cup.

Group A

Jordan
Head Coach:  Vukašin Višnjevac

|}

Libya

Qatar
Head Coach:  Luiz Gonzaga Milioli

|}

Group B

Egypt U21

Kuwait

Syria

Group C

Morocco U23

Sudan
Head Cotch: Sharafeldin Ahmed Musa

|}

United Arab Emirates

Group D

Algeria U23
Head Coach: Meziane Ighil

|}

Lebanon
Head Coach: Diethelm Ferner

|}

Saudi Arabia
Head Coach:  Otto Pfister

|}

References

External links
 1998 Arab Cup squads

Squad
1998